On 6 January 2019, it was reported that a mine shaft in the Kohistan District of Badakhshan Province, Afghanistan had collapsed, killing 30 people. The makeshift shaft was reportedly being used to mine gold. Afghan government sources noted that the mining operation was unregulated and illegal, and that most of the miners were local villagers trying to supplement their incomes through rudimentary gold mining.

References 

2019 mining disasters 
History of Badakhshan Province
January 2019 events in Afghanistan  
Man-made disasters in Afghanistan
Mining disasters in Asia
2019 in Afghanistan
2019 disasters in Afghanistan